Ageleia (Ancient Greek: Ἀγελεία) or Ageleis (Ἀγεληῖς) was an epithet of the Greek goddess Athena, of somewhat obscure definition, mostly playing off the meaning of the Greek words ago, the verb for "leading" or "doing", and leia, a noun meaning "plunder" or "spoils", particularly herds of cattle.

To some writers, it is the name by which she is designated as the leader or protectress of the people, as a herder protects his cattle.  In other sources, the name is taken more literally, and Athena Ageleia is the "pillager" or "she who carries off the spoils".

Notes

References 

 Homer, The Iliad with an English Translation by A.T. Murray, Ph.D. in two volumes. Cambridge, MA., Harvard University Press; London, William Heinemann, Ltd. 1924. Online version at the Perseus Digital Library.
 Homer. Homeri Opera in five volumes. Oxford, Oxford University Press. 1920. Greek text available at the Perseus Digital Library.
 Homer, The Odyssey with an English Translation by A.T. Murray, PH.D. in two volumes. Cambridge, MA., Harvard University Press; London, William Heinemann, Ltd. 1919. Online version at the Perseus Digital Library. Greek text available from the same website.

Epithets of Athena